A list of films produced in France in 1937:

See also
 1937 in France

External links
 French films of 1937 at the Internet Movie Database
French films of 1937 at Cinema-francais.fr

1937
Films
French